Scud refers to a series of tactical ballistic missiles developed by the Soviet Union during the Cold War.

Scud or SCUD may also refer to:
 Scud (crustacean), Amphipoda, a shrimplike aquatic animal
 Scud (dog), a character in the animation Toy Story
 Scud FM, nickname of BBC Radio 4's continuous 1991 Gulf War news service
 Scud Mountain Boys, an American country music band

Acronym 
 Septicemic cutaneous ulcerative disease, a disease found in turtles
 Socle pour le changement, l'unité et la démocratie, a Chadian rebel group

Aviation and meteorology
 Scud (cloud), scattered cumulus under deck
 Scud running, flying at a reduced altitude to avoid clouds

Gliders
 Abbott-Baynes Scud 1
 Abbott-Baynes Scud 2
 Abbott-Baynes Scud 3

Comics and games
 Scud: The Disposable Assassin, a science fiction comic book series
 Scud: The Disposable Assassin (video game), a Sega Saturn game based on the comic book series
 Scud Race, a Sega arcade racing game

People
 Scud (filmmaker), working name of Danny Cheng Wan-Cheung
 Scud, a fictional character in the film Blade II
 Scud Stud, nickname of British journalist Rageh Omaar 
 The Scud, nickname of Australian tennis player Mark Philippoussis
 The Scud Stud, nickname of Canadian journalist Arthur Kent